Felix Castillo Tardío (21 February 1928 – 12 October 1978) was a former Peruvian football right-wing who played for Alianza Lima and the Peru national football team between 1947 and 1956.

Playing career
At club level, he played for Alianza Lima in Peru, where he was part of three league championship winning campaigns (1948, 1952, 1954 & 1955). He also played for América de Cali of Colombia (1950–1951).

National team 
Castillo played for the Peru national team, making 31 appearances and scoring 8 goals.

South American Championship 1947: 7 matches, 1 goal
South American Championship 1949: 7 matches, 4 goals
South American Championship 1955: 5 matches, 1 goal
South American Championship 1956: 5 matches, 1 goal

Honors

References 

1928 births
1978 deaths
Footballers from Lima
Association football wingers
Peruvian footballers
Peru international footballers
1949 South American Championship players
Peruvian Primera División players
Categoría Primera A players
Club Alianza Lima footballers
América de Cali footballers
Peruvian expatriate footballers
Expatriate footballers in Colombia